Pauli Hanhiniemi (born 1964) is a Finnish singer, songwriter (composer and lyricist) and musician, who was born in Alavus. Starting his career in 1982, he formed the famous Finnish rock band Kolmas Nainen in 1982. After the break-up of the band in 1994, he formed Pauli Hanhiniemen Perunateatteri that performed until 2005. He later joined Hehkumo, a band with more traditional sound. In 2009, the highly popular Kolmas Nainen returned with two new studio albums and great commercial success.

Hanhiniemi, a prolific singer, songwriter has been involved in writing songs for his own bands, Kolmas Nainen, Pauli Hanhiniemen Perunateatteri, Hehkumo, as well as many other Finnish musical acts such as Edu Kettunen, Juliet Jonesin Sydän, Kerkko Koskinen, Anna Eriksson, Hauli Bros amongst others. For a comprehensive list, refer to :fi:Luettelo Pauli Hanhiniemen kappaleista

Hanhiniemi has also appeared as an actor in television and film productions, such as in the 2014 Finnish fantasy film Anselmi: The Young Werewolf.

Bands and formations

Kolmas Nainen

Kolmas Nainen (literally The Third Woman in Finnish) is a successful Finnish rock band established in 1982 in Alavus. The band was fronted by Pauli Hanhiniemi and came to fame after taking part in the 1984 Rockin SM-kisoissa, a rock music competition. The band survived for a decade releasing 7 studio albums in addition to a number of live albums, DVDs and compilations. The band is enjoying a comeback since 2009 with a string of new studio and compilation releases. Members included Pauli Hanhiniemi (vocals, keyboards, harmonica, accordion), Pasi Kallioniemi (drums, backing vocals), Raimo Valkama (bass), Sakari Pesola (guitar and backing vocals) and Timo Löyvä (guitar). After guitarist Timo Löyvä left in 1989, he was replaced by Timo Kivikangas.

The band broke up in 1994, but continued performing on brief occasions owing to its popularity. In 2009, it made a big comeback with the release of the album Sydänääniä''' that topped the Finnish Albums Chart and the follow up Me ollaan ne that reached number 2 in the same chart.

Pauli Hanhiniemen Perunateatteri

Immediately after the break-up of the band, Pauli Hanhiniemen formed his band Pauli Hanhiniemen Perunateatteri that continued performing from 1994 until 2005. The band released seven albums and was made up of:
Pauli Hanhiniemi – vocals, harmonica, guitar, keyboard (1994–2005)
Pasi Hiidenniemi – guitar, backing vocals (1994–2005)
Mika Hiironniemi – drums (1994–2004) / replaced by:
Juppo Paavola – drums (2004–2005)
Samuli Happo – bass, backing vocals (1994–2005)
Tommi Laine – guitar, backing vocals (1998–2005)

Pauli Hanhiniemi and Hehkumo

After break-up, main vocalist of the band Pauli Hanhiniemi continued performing solo and with the Finnish band Hehkumo. Materials were mainly traditional Finnish music and instruments but with a modernized twist.

The band was formed of:
Pauli Hanhiniemi – vocals, guitar, harmonica, accordion
Anne-Mari Kivimäki – 5-row accordion, tamburin, vocals
Piia Kleemola – violin, viola, 15-string Kantala, vocals
Antti Paalanen – accordion
Juppo Paavola – drums, percussion
Ville Rauhala – double bass, vocals
Mika Virkkala – mandolin, octave violin, viola

Pauli Hanhiniemi and Hehkumo released two studio albums: Muistoja tulevaisuudesta in 2006 with singles including "Suvisivakointia / Hurja poika", "Suolammen vettä" and "Tähtiin kirjoitettu". This was followed by the album Aukkoja tarinassa in 2008 with singles "Meitä onni hipaisi" and "Vanhanaikainen". The 2008 album made it to number 14 in the Finnish Albums Chart. the band also released a short film Aukkoja tarinassa in 2008.

Discography
Kolmas Nainen
(For details of albums and singles, see Kolmas Nainen discography section)
Studio albums
1986: Kolmas Nainen1987: Paha minut iski1989: Hikiset siivut1990: Hyvää ja kaunista1991: Elämän tarkoitus1992: Tiheän sisään1994: Onnen oikotielläStudio albums (comeback period, 2009-present)
2009: Sydänääniä2013: Me ollaan ne''

Pauli Hanhiniemen Perunateatteri
Albums

Charting Singles

Pauli Hanhiniemi and Hehkumo

Pauli Hanhiniemi (solo)

References

External links

Kolmas Nainen Official website

Finnish rock singers
Finnish male singer-songwriters
1964 births
Living people
Finnish harmonica players
Finnish guitarists
People from Alavus
Musicians from Tampere
21st-century Finnish male singers
20th-century Finnish male singers